Bobbili Yuddham is a 1964 Indian Telugu-language war film, based on the Battle of Bobbili between Bobbili and Vizianagaram kingdoms in 1757. The film was produced and directed by C. Seetaram. It stars N. T. Rama Rao, Bhanumathi Ramakrishna and S.V. Ranga Rao, with music composed by S. Rajeswara Rao.

Plot 
The film begins with the birthday celebrations of Prince Chinna Venkatrayudu, son of Raja Rangarayudu (N. T. Rama Rao), King of Bobbili, for which Raja Vijayaramaraju (Rajanala), King of Vijayanagaram is invited. On the occasion, sports competitions are held in which the Bobbili team wins for which Vijayaramaraju feels jealous and wants to take revenge against them. At the same time, French invaders crack into the country and send a memorandum to Vijayaramaraju by General Bussi (Mukkamala). Vijayaramaraju exploits the situation by shaking hands with Bussi, takes authority over Bobbili and asks them to pay tax. But they refuse. So, Vijayaramaraju plans to attack Bobbili. Meanwhile, Vengalarayudu (C. Seetaram) the younger brother of Rangarayudu, marries Subhadra (Jamuna), sister of Tandra Paparayudu (S. V. Ranga Rao). Soon after the marriage, a spy is seized by Tandra Paparayudu who reveals the conspiracy of Vijayaramaraju and misleads them that their army is arriving from Rajam. On the spot, Tandra Paparayudu leaves to Rajam. Learning it, Bussi takes the forest route and surrounds the fort. Rangarayudu sends Dharmarayudu (M. Balaiah) for a compromise, which fails. Even the message sent to Tandra Paparayadu regarding the hazardous situation is intercepted. The war begins, the French warriors enter by breaking the fort walls with artilleries when many soldiers die, Vengalarayudu is backstabbed and Subhadra also follows him.

Finally, Raja Rangarayudu himself moves to the battlefield when his wife Mallamma Devi (Bhanumathi Ramakrishna) realizes that the Bobbili dynasty is going to fall, to safeguard their heritage she sends Chinna Venkatrayudu in disguise to Samarlakota. Meanwhile, the French army cannot withstand before Rangarayudu's valor. So Bussi orders to blast the fort in which all men die and women inside the fort, including Mallamma Devi, commit suicide. Tandra Paparayudu senses the foul play of Bussi and immediately rushes to Bobbili. At the same time, Queen Chandrayamma (Jayanthi) wife of Vijayaramaraju also drives to Bobbili to stop the battle. On the way, she finds alone Chinna Venkatrayudu and safeguards him.  By the time, Tandra Paparayudu reaches Bobbili, he spots corpse on all sides along with Rangarayudu & Mallamma and bursts out with avenge. At midnight, he enters into the tent of Vijayaramaraju, slaughters him and commits suicide when Bussi tries to arrest him. Chandrayamma also dies, looking at her husband's dead body uniting the hands of the Bobbili & Vijayanagaram princes.

Cast 
N. T. Rama Rao as Raja Rangarayalu
Bhanumathi Ramakrishna as Mallama Devi
S. V. Ranga Rao as Tandra Paparayudu
Rajanala as Vijayaramaraju
V. Nagayya as Milk Man
Dhulipala as Narsarayudu
Mukkamala as Bussy
Padmanabham as Varahalu
M. Balaiah as Dharmarayudu
C. S. R. as Dubassi Lakshmanna
C. Seetaram as Vegallarayudu
M. R. Radha as Hyder Jung
Jamuna as Subhadra
Jayanthi as Chandrayamma
Geetanjali as Swarna
L. Vijayalakshmi as Dancer
Surabhi Balasaraswathi as Venkatalakshmi

Soundtrack 

Music composed by S. Rajeswara Rao.

References

External links 
 

1964 films
1960s Telugu-language films
Indian war films
Films set in Andhra Pradesh
Indian films based on actual events
History of India on film
Films set in 1757